This is a list of settlements in both the non-metropolitan shire and ceremonial county of Oxfordshire, England. 

Places marked ¹ were in the administrative county of Berkshire before the boundary changes of 1974. They are within the historic county boundaries of Berkshire.  See also the list of places transferred from Berkshire to Oxfordshire in 1974.

A
,
, Adwell, Albury,
, Alvescot,
,
,
, Appleton-with-Eaton,  Ardington, Ardington Wick,
,
, Ascott d'Oyley, Ascott Earl
, Ashbury, Asthall,
, Aston Rowant,
, Aston Upthorpe

B
, Baldon Row,

,
, Barford St. John, Barford St. Michael, Barnard Gate,
, Baulking,
, Beckley, Begbroke,
,  Berinsfield,
,
,
,
,
, Binsey, Bix and Assendon, Bix, Black Bourton, Blackthorn,
,
,
, Blewbury,
,
, Bodicote,
, Bould, Bourton, Bow,
, Brighthampton,
,
,
,
,
, Brookhampton,
, Broughton Poggs, Bruern, Buckland,
,
, Burdrop,

C
,
,
,
, Cassington, Caversfield,
, Chalgrove,
,
, Charlton-on-Otmoor, Charney Bassett,  Chastleton,
,
,
,  Chilson, Chilton,
, Chinnor,
,
,
,
,
, Church Hanborough, Clanfield, Clattercote, Claydon, Clifton, Clifton Hampden, Cogges,
, Coleshill,
, Compton Beauchamp,
, Coscote,
,
, Cottisford,
, Crawley,
,
,
,
,
,
,
,
,
, Curbridge,

D
Dean,
, Denchworth, Denton,
,
,
,
,
,
,
, Ducklington,
,
,
,

E
, Easington,
,
, East Hagbourne,
,
, East Hendred,
, Eaton,
, Elsfield, Emmington, Enslow,
, Epwell,
, Exlade Street,

F
,
,
,
, Fencott,
,
,
, Filchampstead, Filkins, Finmere,
, Forest Hill, Foscot,
, Freeland,
, Fringford, Fritwell, Fulscot, Fulwell,

G
Gagingwell, Gainfield,
,
, Glympton, Godington,
,
,
,
,
, Grafton,
, Great Bourton,
,
,
,
,
,
,

H
Hailey, Hampton Gay, Hanney, Hanwell, Hardwick (West Oxfordshire), Hardwick (Cherwell), Harpsden,
,
,
,
,
, Hempton,
, Henton,
, Hethe, Heythrop, Highmoor, Hinksey, Hinksey Hill,
, Holton, Holwell,
,
, Hornton,
,

I
Idbury, Idstone, Ipsden,

J
, Juniper Hill

K
, Kencot,
,
,
,
,
,
, Kingston Blount,
,

L
, Langford,
, Launton,
,
,
,
,
,
, Little Faringdon,
,
,
, Littlestoke,
,
,
, Long Wittenham,
 Lower Assendon, Lower Heyford,
,
,
,
,
,

M
Maidensgrove,
, Marsh Baldon,
, Merton, Middle Assendon, Middle Aston,
, Milcombe,
,
,
,
, Mixbury, Mollington, Mongewell, Moreton, Moulsford, Murcott

N
,
,
,
, Netherton,
, Newington, Newnham Murren, Newton Purcell,
,
,
, North Moreton, North Newington,
, North Stoke, Northend, Northmoor,
,

O
Oakley, Oddington, Old Chalford, Old Headington, Over Kiddington,
,
,

P
Piddington, Pishill, Postcombe, Prescote,  Preston Crowmarsh,
, Pyrton.

R
Radford, Ramsden, Roke,
, Rotherfield Peppard
, Russell's Water, Rycote

S
, Salford,
,
, Sarsden, Seacourt,
,
,
, Shelswell,
, Shenington, Shifford, Shilton,
,
, Shipton-on-Cherwell,
, Shirburn, Shorthampton,
,
, Sibford Ferris, Sibford Gower,
,
,
,
, Souldern,
, South Moreton, South Newington,
, South Weston, Southmoor
, Spelsbury,
,
,
,
,
, Stanton St. John,
,
,
, Stoke Lyne, Stoke Row, Stoke Talmage, Stonor, Stratton Audley,
, Sunningwell,
, Sutton Wick,
, Swerford,
,
 Sydenham

T
, Taston, Tadmarton, Taynton,
,
,
,
,
,
,
,
,
, Tusmore

U
, Upper Arncott,
,
,
,
,

W
,
,
, Wardington,
,
,
, Waterstock,
, Weald, Wendlebury,
, West Hagbourne,
,
,
, Westcot,
,
, Westwell,
,
,
, Widford, Wigginton, Winterbrook, Wilcote,
,
,
,
,
,
,
, Worsham, Worton near Cassington, Wroxton,
,

Y
, Yelford

See also
 List of places in England
 :Category:Areas of Oxford
 :Category:Towns in Oxfordshire

Oxfordshire
Places
Places
Places